Described by French naturalist Anselme Gaëtan Desmarest in 1826, the genus Calyptorhynchus has two species of cockatoos. They are all mostly black in colour, and the taxa may be differentiated partly by size and partly by small areas of red, grey, and yellow plumage, especially in the tail feathers. Studies based on the mitochondrial DNA 12S gene fragment suggested that other sexually dichromatic species, the gang-gang cockatoo and the cockatiel may be the closest living relatives of Calyptorhynchus. However, subsequent studies, including more genes confirm the morphological taxonomy with the gang-gang cockatoo most closely related to the galah, within the white cockatoo group, and with the cockatiel as a third distinct subfamily of cockatoos. 
{| class="wikitable"
|-
! Subgenus !! Image !! Scientific name  !! Common name !! Subspecies !! Distribution
|-
! rowspan="2" style="text-align:center;"|Calyptorhynchus - black-and-red cockatoos
|||Calyptorhynchus banksii|| Red-tailed black cockatoo
||
 Calyptorhynchus banksii banksii Calyptorhynchus banksii escondidusCalyptorhynchus banksii graptogyne Calyptorhynchus banksii naso Calyptorhynchus banksii samueli||Australia
|-
||| Calyptorhynchus lathami|| Glossy black cockatoo
||
 Calyptorhynchus lathami lathami Calyptorhynchus lathami erebus Calyptorhynchus lathami halmaturinus||eastern Australia. 
|-
|}

The Yellow-tailed black cockatoo, Baudin's black cockatoo and Carnaby's black cockatoo were previously included in Calyptorhynchus as subgenus Zanda. However, based on genetic divergence Zanda was recognised as a genus and the three species transferred out of Calyptorhynchus.

References

Further reading

 Astuti, Dwi (2004?): A phylogeny of cockatoos (Aves: Psittaciformes) inferred from DNA sequences of the seventh intron of nuclear β''-fibrinogen gene. Doctoral work, Graduate School of Environmental Earth Science, Hokkaido University, Japan. PDF fulltext
 
 

 
Calyptorhynchinae
Bird genera
Taxa named by Anselme Gaëtan Desmarest